Dira jansei, or Janse's widow, is a butterfly of the family Nymphalidae. It is found on wooded hillsides in the savanna/grassland ecotone in Limpopo's Strydpoortberg and Drakensberg and from the Makapans Cave to Mariepskop.

The wingspan is 48–55 mm for males and 52–58 mm for females. Adults are on wing from late February to mid-March. There is one generation per year.

The larvae feed on various Poaceae species, including Ehrharta erecta and Pennisetum clandestinum.

References

Butterflies described in 1911
Satyrini